Quizizz is an Indian educational software company headquartered in Bengaluru, India.

See also 
 Educational technology
 Gamification
 Kahoot

Reference

External links 

 Official Web page 
2015 establishments in India
Gamification
Educational technology
Internet properties established in 2015

Indian educational websites